This is a list of award winners and league leaders for the Los Angeles Dodgers professional baseball franchise, including its years in Brooklyn (1883–1957).

Awards

Most Valuable Player (NL)
 Brooklyn
 – Jake Daubert
1924 – Dazzy Vance
1941 – Dolph Camilli
1949 – Jackie Robinson
1951 – Roy Campanella
1953 – Roy Campanella
1955 – Roy Campanella
1956 – Don Newcombe
 Los Angeles
1962 – Maury Wills
1963 – Sandy Koufax
1974 – Steve Garvey
1988 – Kirk Gibson
2014 – Clayton Kershaw
2019 – Cody Bellinger

Cy Young (NL)
 Brooklyn
1956 – Don Newcombe (MLB)
 Los Angeles
1962 – Don Drysdale (MLB)
1963 – Sandy Koufax (MLB)
1965 – Sandy Koufax (MLB)
1966 – Sandy Koufax (MLB)
1974 – Mike Marshall
1981 – Fernando Valenzuela
1988 – Orel Hershiser
2003 – Éric Gagné
2011 – Clayton Kershaw
2013 – Clayton Kershaw
2014 – Clayton Kershaw

Triple Crown
 Brooklyn
1924 – Dazzy Vance
 Los Angeles
1963 – Sandy Koufax
1965 – Sandy Koufax
1966 – Sandy Koufax
2011 – Clayton Kershaw

Jackie Robinson Rookie of the Year Award (NL)
 Brooklyn
1947 – Jackie Robinson (MLB)
1949 – Don Newcombe
1952 – Joe Black
1953 – Jim Gilliam
 Los Angeles
1960 – Frank Howard
1965 – Jim Lefebvre
1969 – Ted Sizemore
1979 – Rick Sutcliffe
1980 – Steve Howe
1981 – Fernando Valenzuela
1982 – Steve Sax
1992 – Eric Karros
1993 – Mike Piazza
1994 – Raúl Mondesi
1995 – Hideo Nomo
1996 – Todd Hollandsworth
2016 – Corey Seager
2017 – Cody Bellinger

Gold Glove Award (NL)

Pitcher
Andy Messersmith ([2], 1974–75)
Fernando Valenzuela (1986)
Orel Hershiser (1988)
Greg Maddux ([2], 2006, 2008)
Clayton Kershaw (2011)
Zack Greinke ([2], 2014–15)

Catcher
Johnny Roseboro ([2], 1961, 1966)
Charles Johnson (1998)
Russell Martin (2007)

First Base
Gil Hodges ([3], 1957–59)
Wes Parker ([6], 1967–1972)
Steve Garvey ([4], 1974–77)
Adrián González (2014)

Second Base
Davey Lopes (1978)
Charlie Neal (1959)
Orlando Hudson (2009)

Shortstop
Maury Wills ([2], 1961–62)
César Izturis (2004)

Third base
NONE

Outfield
Willie Davis ([3], 1971–73)
Dusty Baker (1981)
Raúl Mondesí ([2], 1995, 1997)
Steve Finley (2004)
Matt Kemp ([2], 2009, 2011)
Andre Ethier (2011)
Cody Bellinger (2019)
Mookie Betts (2020, 2022)

Wilson Defensive Player of the Year Award

See explanatory note at Atlanta Braves award winners and league leaders
Defensive Team of the Year
 (2017)
First base (in MLB)
Adrián González (2014)
Third base (in MLB)
Juan Uribe (in MLB) (2014)
Right field (in MLB)
Yasiel Puig (2017)

Silver Slugger Award (NL)
Pitcher
Fernando Valenzuela [2] (1981, 1983)
Tim Leary (1988)
Orel Hershiser (1993)
Zack Greinke (2013)

Catcher
Mike Piazza [5] (1993–1997)
Russell Martin (2007)

First base
Eddie Murray (1990)
Eric Karros (1995)
Adrián González (2014)

Second base
Steve Sax (1986)
Jeff Kent (2005)

Third base
Adrián Beltré (2004)

Shortstop
Corey Seager [2] (2016-2017)
Trea Turner (2022)

Outfield
Dusty Baker [2] (1980-1981)
Pedro Guerrero (1982)
Kirk Gibson (1988)
Andre Ethier (2009)
Matt Kemp [2] (2009, 2011)
Cody Bellinger (2019)
Mookie Betts [2] (2020, 2022)

Post-Season and All-Star Game MVP

World Series
1955 – Johnny Podres
1959 – Larry Sherry
1963 – Sandy Koufax
1965 – Sandy Koufax
1981 – Ron Cey, Pedro Guerrero and Steve Yeager
1988 – Orel Hershiser
2020 – Corey Seager
NL Championship Series
1977 – Dusty Baker
1978 – Steve Garvey
1981 – Burt Hooton
1988 – Orel Hershiser
2017 – Chris Taylor and Justin Turner
2018 – Cody Bellinger
2020 - Corey Seager
All-Star Game (Note: This was re-named the Ted Williams Most Valuable Player Award in 2002.)
1962 – Maury Wills (Game 1)
1977 – Don Sutton
1978 – Steve Garvey
1996 – Mike Piazza

Topps All-Star Rookie teams

1959 – Ron Fairly (OF)
1960 – Tommy Davis (OF) & Frank Howard (OF)
1969 – Ted Sizemore (2B)
1971 – Bill Buckner (OF)
1973 – Davey Lopes (2B)
1981 – Fernando Valenzuela (P)
1982 – Steve Sax (2B)
1983 – Greg Brock (1B)
1988 – Tim Belcher (P)
1992 – Eric Karros (1B)

1993 – Mike Piazza (C)
1994 – Raúl Mondesí (OF)
1995 – Hideo Nomo (P)
1996 – Todd Hollandsworth (OF)
1997 – Wilton Guerrero (2B)
2006 – Russell Martin (C) & Andre Ethier (OF)
2007 – James Loney (1B)
2011 – Dee Gordon (SS)
2013 – Yasiel Puig (OF) & Hyun-jin Ryu (P)
2016 – Kenta Maeda (P), Corey Seager (SS), Julio Urías (P)
2017 – Cody Bellinger (1B)

Baseball America All-Rookie Team
See: Baseball America#Baseball America All-Rookie Team
2011 – Dee Gordon (SS)
2013 – Yasiel Puig (OF), Hyun-jin Ryu (P)
2015 – Joc Pederson (OF)
2016 – Kenta Maeda (P), Corey Seager (SS)
2017 – Cody Bellinger (1B)
2018 – Walker Buehler (P)

Comeback Player of the Year Award
1966 – Phil Regan
1971 – Al Downing
1974 – Jimmy Wynn
1976 – Tommy John
1980 – Jerry Reuss
1987 – Pedro Guerrero
1988 – Tim Leary
1991 – Orel Hershiser
1994 – Tim Wallach
2006 – Nomar Garciaparra

Relief Man Award
2003 – Éric Gagné
2004 – Éric Gagné

Trevor Hoffman NL Reliever of the Year Award
2016 – Kenley Jansen
2017 – Kenley Jansen

Roberto Clemente Award
1981 – Steve Garvey
2012 – Clayton Kershaw

Manager of the Year (NL)

See footnote
Tommy Lasorda (1983 and 1988)
Dave Roberts (2016)

MLB "This Year in Baseball Awards"

Note: These awards were renamed the "GIBBY Awards" (Greatness in Baseball Yearly) in 2010 and then the "Esurance MLB Awards" in 2015.

"GIBBY Awards" Most Valuable Player
 – Clayton Kershaw

"GIBBY Awards" Best Starting Pitcher
2014 – Clayton Kershaw

Commissioner's Historic Achievement Award
2007 – Rachel Robinson (wife of Jackie)
2014 – Vin Scully

Baseball America Major League Player of the Year

2011 – Matt Kemp
2014 – Clayton Kershaw

USA Today NL Top Pitcher
Clayton Kershaw (2011)

Warren Spahn Award
See: Warren Spahn Award
Clayton Kershaw (2011, 2013, 2014)
Julio Urías (2021)

Branch Rickey Award

1996 – Brett Butler
2006 – Tommy Lasorda
2013 – Clayton Kershaw

Sporting News Manager of the Decade
See: Sporting News#Major League Baseball
Joe Torre (2009) (also managed the New York Yankees, 2000-07)

The Sporting News Manager of the Year

Note: Established in 1936, this award was given annually to one manager in Major League Baseball. In 1986 it was expanded to honor one manager from each league.
See footnote
1939 – Leo Durocher
1955 – Walter Alston
1959 – Walter Alston
1963 – Walter Alston
2016 – Dave Roberts

Associated Press Manager of the Year Award
See: Associated Press#AP sports awards
Note: Discontinued in 2001. From 1959 to 1983, the award was given annually to one manager in each league. From 1984 to 2000, the award was given to one manager in all of Major League Baseball.
See footnote
1959 – Walter Alston (in NL)
1965 – Walter Alston (in NL)
1966 – Walter Alston (in NL)
1974 – Walter Alston (in NL)
1977 – Tommy Lasorda (in NL)
1981 – Tommy Lasorda (in NL)
1983 – Tommy Lasorda (in NL)
1988 – Tommy Lasorda (in MLB)

Chuck Tanner Major League Baseball Manager of the Year Award

See footnote
Joe Torre (2007)

MLB Executive of the Year Award
2020 - Andrew Friedman

Team records (single-season and career)

All-Star Game selections

Pitchers
Tyler Anderson (2022)
Chad Billingsley (2009)
Ralph Branca [3] (1947, 1948, 1949)
Jim Brewer (1973)
Kevin Brown [2] (2000, 2003)
Jonathan Broxton [2] (2009, 2010)
Walker Buehler [2] (2019, 2021)
Don Drysdale [9] (1959, 1959-2, 1961-2, 1962, 1963, 1964, 1965, 1967, 1968)
Carl Erskine (1954)
Éric Gagné [3] (2002, 2003, 2004)
Tony Gonsolin (2022)
Zack Greinke [2] (2014, 2015)
Orel Hershiser [3] (1987, 1988, 1989)
Kirby Higbe (1946)
Burt Hooton (1981)
Steve Howe (1982)
Jay Howell (1989)
Kenley Jansen [3] (2016, 2017, 2018)
Tommy John (1978)
Clayton Kershaw [9] (2011, 2012, 2013, 2014, 2015, 2016, 2017, 2019, 2022)
Sandy Koufax [7] (1961, 1961-2, 1962, 1963, 1964, 1965, 1966)
Hong-Chih Kuo (2010)
Clem Labine [2] (1956, 1957)
Mike Marshall [2] (1974, 1975)
Ramón Martínez (1990)
Andy Messersmith [2] (1974, 1975)
Mike Morgan (1991)
Van Lingle Mungo [4] (1934, 1935, 1936, 1937)
Don Newcombe [4] (1949, 1950, 1951, 1955)
Hideo Nomo (1995)
Claude Osteen [3] (1967, 1970, 1973)
Chan Ho Park (2001)
Brad Penny [2] (2006, 2007)
Odalis Pérez (2002)
Johnny Podres [4] (1958, 1960, 1960-2, 1962-2)
Phil Regan (1966)
Jerry Reuss (1980)
Rick Rhoden (1976)
Preacher Roe [4] (1949, 1950, 1951, 1952)
Hyun-jin Ryu (2019)
Takashi Saito (2007)
Jeff Shaw [2] (1998, 2001)
Bill Singer (1969)
Ross Stripling (2018)
Don Sutton [4] (1972, 1973, 1975, 1977)
Fernando Valenzuela [6] (1981, 1982, 1983, 1984, 1985, 1986)
Bob Welch (1980)
Stan Williams (1960, 1960-2)
Alex Wood (2017)
Todd Worrell [2] (1995, 1996)
Whit Wyatt [4] (1939, 1940, 1941, 1942)

Catcher
Roy Campanella [8] (1949, 1950, 1951, 1952, 1953, 1954, 1955, 1956)
Bruce Edwards (1947)
Yasmani Grandal (2015)
Tom Haller (1968)
Paul Lo Duca [2] (2003, 2004)
Al López (1934)
Russell Martin [2] (2007, 2008)
Mickey Owen [4] (1941, 1942, 1943, 1944)
Babe Phelps [3] (1938, 1939, 1940)
Mike Piazza [5] (1993, 1994, 1995, 1996, 1997)
Johnny Roseboro [5] (1958, 1961, 1961-2, 1962, 1962-2)
Mike Scioscia [2] (1989, 1990)

First Baseman
Dolph Camilli [2] (1939, 1941)
Freddie Freeman (2022)
Nomar Garciaparra (2006)
Steve Garvey [8] (1974, 1975, 1976, 1977, 1978, 1979, 1980, 1981)
Jim Gilliam (1956)
Adrián González (2015)
Gil Hodges [8] (1949, 1950, 1951, 1952, 1953, 1954, 1955, 1957)
Norm Larker (1960, 1960-2)
Max Muncy [2] (2019, 2021)
Eddie Murray (1991)
Eddie Stanky (1947)

Second Baseman
Pete Coscarart (1940)
Tony Cuccinello (1933)
Dee Gordon (2014)
Billy Grabarkewitz (1970)
Billy Herman [3] (1941, 1942, 1943)
Orlando Hudson (2009)
Jeff Kent (2005)
Jim Lefebvre (1966)
Davey Lopes [4] (1978, 1979, 1980, 1981)
Charlie Neal [2] (1960, 1960-2)
Willie Randolph (1989)
Jackie Robinson [4] (1949, 1950, 1951, 1952)
Juan Samuel (1991)
Steve Sax [3] (1982, 1983, 1986)
Mike Sharperson (1992)

Shortstop
Leo Durocher [2] (1938, 1940)
Rafael Furcal (2010)
César Izturis (2005)
Charlie Neal (1959-2)
José Offerman (1995)
Pee Wee Reese [10] (1942, 1946, 1947, 1948, 1949, 1950, 1951, 1952, 1953, 1954)
Bill Russell [3] (1973, 1976, 1980)
Corey Seager [2] (2016, 2017)
Trea Turner (2022)
Maury Wills [6] (1961, 1961-2, 1962, 1962-2, 1963, 1965, 1966)

Third Baseman
Ron Cey [6] (1974, 1975, 1976, 1977, 1978, 1979)
Pedro Guerrero (1983)
Cookie Lavagetto [4] (1938, 1939, 1940, 1941)
Jackie Robinson (1953)
Justin Turner [2] (2017, 2021)
Arky Vaughan (1942)

Outfielder
Dusty Baker [2] (1981, 1982)
Cody Bellinger [2] (2017, 2019)
Mookie Betts [2] (2021, 2022)
Brett Butler (1991)
Gino Cimoli (1957)
Tommy Davis [3] (1962, 1962-2, 1963)
Willie Davis [2] (1971, 1973)
Andre Ethier  [2] (2010, 2011)
Carl Furillo [2] (1952, 1953)
Augie Galan [2] (1943, 1944)
Jim Gilliam (1959-2)
Shawn Green (2002)
Pedro Guerrero [3] (1981, 1985, 1987)
Matt Kemp [3] (2011, 2012, 2018)
Mike Marshall (1984)
Joe Medwick [3} (1940, 1941, 1942)
Rick Monday (1978)
Raúl Mondesí (1995)
Wally Moon [2] (1959, 1959-2)
Manny Mota (1973)
Joc Pederson (2015)
Yasiel Puig (2014)
Pete Reiser [3] (1941, 1942, 1946)
Jackie Robinson (1954)
Gary Sheffield [3] (1998, 1999, 2000)
Reggie Smith [3] (1977, 1978, 1980)
Duke Snider [6] (1950, 1951, 1952, 1953, 1954, 1955, 1956)
Darryl Strawberry (1991)
Chris Taylor (2021)
Dixie Walker [3] (1943, 1944, 1946, 1947)
Jimmy Wynn [2] (1974, 1975)

Years in italics are selected starters

Minor-league system

Baseball America Minor League Player of the Year Award
 – Mike Marshall (Albuquerque Dukes; AAA)
 – Paul Konerko (Albuquerque Dukes; AAA)
 – Gavin Lux (Tulsa Drillers; AA & Oklahoma City Dodgers; AAA)

USA Today Minor League Player of the Year Award
 – Billy Ashley (Albuquerque Dukes; AAA)

MiLB George M. Trautman Award / Topps Player of the Year
 – Brian Cavazos-Galvez (Pioneer League; Ogden Raptors; OF) & Dee Gordon (Midwest League; Great Lakes Loons; SS)

MiLB Joe Bauman Home Run Award
 – Mitch Jones (Albuquerque Isotopes; AAA; Pacific Coast League)

Los Angeles Dodgers Minor League Player of the Year
1989 – Mike Huff (Albuquerque Dukes; AAA)
1990 – Henry Rodríguez (San Antonio Missions; AA)
1991 – Eric Karros (Albuquerque Dukes; AAA)
1992 – Mike Piazza (San Antonio Missions; AA & Albuquerque Dukes; AAA)
1993 – Billy Ashley (Albuquerque Dukes; AAA)
1994 – Billy Ashley (Albuquerque Dukes; AAA)
1995 – Adam Riggs (San Bernardino Spirit; A)
1996 – Paul Konerko (San Antonio Missions; AA & Albuquerque Dukes; AAA)
1997 – Paul Konerko (Albuquerque Dukes; AAA)
1998 – Ángel Peña (San Antonio Missions; AA)
1999 – Chin-Feng Chen (San Bernardino Stampede; A)
2000 – Joe Thurston (San Bernardino Stampede; A)
2001 – Phil Hiatt (Vero Beach Dodgers; A)
2002 – Joe Thurston (Las Vegas 51s, AAA)
2003 – Franklin Gutiérrez (Vero Beach Dodgers; A & Jacksonville Suns; AA)
2004 – Joel Guzmán (Vero Beach Dodgers; A & Jacksonville Suns; AA)
2005 – Andy LaRoche (Vero Beach Dodgers; A & Jacksonville Suns; AA)
2006 – James Loney (Las Vegas 51s; AAA)
2007 – Chin-lung Hu (Jacksonville Suns; AA & Las Vegas 51s; AAA)
2008 – Iván DeJesús, Jr. (Jacksonville Suns; AA)
2009 – Dee Gordon (Great Lakes Loons; A)
2010 – Jerry Sands (Great Lakes Loons; A & Chattanooga Lookouts; AA)
2011 – Scott Van Slyke (Chattanooga Lookouts; AA)
2012 – Joc Pederson (Rancho Cucamonga Quakes; Hi-A)
2013 – Scott Schebler (Rancho Cucamonga Quakes; Hi-A)
2014 – Joc Pederson (Albuquerque Isotopes; AAA) & Corey Seager (Rancho Cucamonga Quakes; Hi-A & Chattanooga Lookouts; AA)
2015 – Alex Verdugo (Great Lakes Loons; A & Rancho Cucamonga Quakes; Hi-A)
2016 – Edwin Ríos (Great Lakes Loons; A, Rancho Cucamonga Quakes; Hi-A & Tulsa Drillers; AA)
2017 – Keibert Ruiz (Great Lakes Loons; A & Rancho Cucamonga Quakes; Hi-A)
2018 – Gavin Lux (Rancho Cucamonga Quakes; Hi-A & Tulsa Drillers; AA)
2019 – Gavin Lux (Tulsa Drillers; AA & Oklahoma City Dodgers; AAA)
2021 – Miguel Vargas; (Great Lakes Loons; Hi-A & Tulsa Drillers; AA)
2022 – Diego Cartaya; (Rancho Cucamonga Quakes; A & Great Lakes Loons; Hi-A)

Los Angeles Dodgers Minor League Pitcher of the Year
1989 – Jim Poole (Vero Beach Dodgers; A)
1990 – Jamie McAndrew (Bakersfield Dodgers; Hi-A & San Antonio Missions; AA)
1991 – Pedro Martínez (San Antonio Missions; AA & Albuquerque Dukes; AAA)
1992 – Todd Williams (Bakersfield Dodgers; Hi-A & San Antonio Dodgers; AA)
1993 – Kip Gross (Albuquerque Dukes; AAA)
1994 – Greg Hansell (Albuquerque Dukes; AAA)
1995 – Gary Rath (San Antonio Missions; AA & Albuquerque Dukes; AAA)
1996 – Billy Neal (Vero Beach Dodgers; Hi-A)
1997 – Dennys Reyes (San Antonio Missions; AA & Albuquerque Dukes; AAA)
1998 – Luke Prokopec (San Bernardino Stampede; Hi-A & San Antonio Missions; AA)
1999 – Éric Gagné (San Antonio Missions; AA)
2000 – Carlos Garcia (San Bernardino Stampede; Hi-A)
2001 – Ricardo Rodríguez (Vero Beach Dodgers; Hi-A)
2002 – Edwin Jackson (South Georgia Waves; A)
2003 – Greg Miller (Vero Beach Dodgers; Hi-A & Jacksonville Suns; AA)
2004 – Chad Billingsley (Vero Beach Dodgers; Hi-A & Jacksonville Suns; AA)
2005 – Chad Billingsley (Jacksonville Suns; AA)
2006 – Mark Alexander (Jacksonville Suns; AA & Las Vegas 51s; AAA)
2007 – James McDonald (Inland Empire 66ers of San Bernardino; Hi-A & Jacksonville Suns; AA)
2008 – James McDonald (Jacksonville Suns; AA)
2009 – Scott Elbert (Chattanooga Lookouts; AA & Albuquerque Isotopes; AAA)
2010 – Rubby De La Rosa (Great Lakes Loons; A & Chattanooga Lookouts; AA)
2011 – Shawn Tolleson (Chattanooga Lookouts; AA)
2012 – John Ely (Albuquerque Isotopes; AAA)
2013 – Zach Lee (Chattanooga Lookouts; AA) 
2014 – Julio Urías (Rancho Cucamonga Quakes; Hi-A)
2015 – Zach Lee (Oklahoma City Dodgers; AAA)
2016 – Brock Stewart (Rancho Cucamonga Quakes; Hi-A, Tulsa Drillers; AA & Oklahoma City Dodgers; AAA)
2017 – Walker Buehler (Rancho Cucamonga Quakes; Hi-A, Tulsa Drillers; AA & Oklahoma City Dodgers; AAA)
2018 – Tony Gonsolin (Rancho Cucamonga Quakes; Hi-A & Tulsa Drillers; AA)
2019 – Josiah Gray (Great Lakes Loons; A, Rancho Cucamonga Quakes; Hi-A & Tulsa Drillers; AA)
2021 – Hyun-il Choi (Rancho Cucamonga Quakes; A & Great Lakes Loons; Hi-A)
2022 – Gavin Stone (Great Lakes Loons; High-A, Tulsa Drillers; AA & Oklahoma City Dodgers; AAA)

Other achievements

National Baseball Hall of Fame
See: 

Ford C. Frick Award recipientsSee: 
Names in bold received the award based primarily on their work as Dodgers broadcasters.
Red Barber
Ernie Harwell
Jaime Jarrín
Vin Scully

Retired numbers
See: 

Associated Press Athlete of the Year

1962 – Maury Wills
1963 – Sandy Koufax
1965 – Sandy Koufax
1988 – Orel Hershiser

Hickok BeltNote: The Hickok Belt trophy was awarded to the top professional athlete of the year in the U.S., from 1950 to 1976.''
1962 – Maury Wills
1963 – Sandy Koufax
1965 – Sandy Koufax

California Sports Hall of Fame

League leaders

Hitting

NL batting average champions
1892 – Dan Brouthers (.335)
1914 – Jake Daubert (.329)
1913 – Jake Daubert (.350)
1918 – Zack Wheat (.335)
1932 – Lefty O'Doul (.368)
1941 – Pete Reiser (.343)
1944 – Dixie Walker (.357)
1949 – Jackie Robinson (.342)
1953 – Carl Furillo (.344)
1962 – Tommy Davis (.346)
1963 – Tommy Davis (.326)
2021 – Trea Turner (.328)

Doubles
1941 – Pete Reiser (39)
1970 – Wes Parker (47)
2019 – Corey Seager (44)
2022 – Freddie Freeman (47)

Home runs
1924 – Jack Fournier (27)
1941 – Dolph Camilli (34)
1956 – Duke Snider (43)
2001 – Shawn Green (49)
2004 – Adrián Beltré (48)
2011 – Matt Kemp (39)

Runs scored
1890 – Hub Collins (148)
1899 – Willie Keeler (140)
1941 – Pete Reiser (117)
1943 – Arky Vaughan (112)
1945 – Eddie Stanky (128)
1949 – Pee Wee Reese (132)
1953 – Duke Snider (132)
1954 – Duke Snider (120)
1955 – Duke Snider (126)
1991 – Brett Butler (112)
2011 – Matt Kemp (115)
2022 – Mookie Betts & Freddy Freeman (117)

Runs batted in
1919 – Hy Myers (73)
1941 – Dolph Camilli (120)
1945 – Dixie Walker (124)
1953 – Roy Campanella (142)
1955 – Duke Snider (136)
1962 – Tommy Davis (153)
2011 – Matt Kemp (126)
2014 – Adrián González (116)

Stolen bases
1892 – John Montgomery Ward (88)
1903 – Jimmy Sheckard (67)
1942 – Pete Reiser (20)
1943 – Arky Vaughan (20)
1946 – Pete Reiser (34)
1947 – Jackie Robinson (29)
1949 – Jackie Robinson (37)
1952 – Pee Wee Reese (30)
1960 – Maury Wills (56)
1961 – Maury Wills (42)
1962 – Maury Wills (112)
1963 – Maury Wills (49)
1964 – Maury Wills (63)
1965 – Maury Wills (105)
1975 – Davey Lopes (77)
1976 – Davey Lopes (63)
2014 – Dee Gordon (64)
2021 – Trea Turner (32)

Triples
1898 – John Anderson (22)
1901 – Jimmy Sheckard (21)
1904 – Harry Lumley (18)
1907 – Whitey Alperman (16)
1918 – Jake Daubert (15)
1919 – Hy Myers (14)
1920 – Hy Myers (22)
1942 – Pete Reiser (17)
1945 – Luis Olmo (13)
1953 – Jim Gilliam (17)
1959 – Wally Moon & Charlie Neal (11)
1962 – Willie Davis & Maury Wills (10)
1970 – Willie Davis  (16)
1994 – Brett Butler (9)
2014 – Dee Gordon (12)
2022 – Gavin Lux (7)

Pitching

E.R.A.
1924 – Dazzy Vance (2.16)
1928 – Dazzy Vance (2.09)
1930 – Dazzy Vance (2.61)
1957 – Johnny Podres (2.66)
1962 – Sandy Koufax (2.54)
1963 – Sandy Koufax (1.88)
1964 – Sandy Koufax (1.74)
1965 – Sandy Koufax (2.04)
1966 – Sandy Koufax (1.73)
1980 – Don Sutton (2.20)
1984 – Alejandro Peña (2.48)
2000 – Kevin Brown (2.58)
2011 – Clayton Kershaw (2.28)
2012 – Clayton Kershaw (2.53)
2013 – Clayton Kershaw (1.83)
2014 – Clayton Kershaw (1.77)
2015 – Zack Greinke (1.66)
2017 – Clayton Kershaw (2.31)
2019 – Hyun-jin Ryu (2.32)
2022 – Julio Urías (2.16)

Saves
1974 – Mike Marshall (21)
1996 – Todd Worrell (44)
2003 – Éric Gagné (55)
2017 – Kenley Jansen (41)

Strikeouts
1921 – Burleigh Grimes (136)
1922 – Dazzy Vance (134)
1923 – Dazzy Vance (197)
1924 – Dazzy Vance (262)
1925 – Dazzy Vance (221)
1926 – Dazzy Vance (140)
1927 – Dazzy Vance (184)
1928 – Dazzy Vance (200)
1951 – Don Newcombe (164)
1959 – Don Drysdale (242)
1960 – Don Drysdale (246)
1961 – Sandy Koufax (269)
1962 – Don Drysdale (232)
1963 – Sandy Koufax (306)
1965 – Sandy Koufax (382) (NL record)
1966 – Sandy Koufax (317)
1981 – Fernando Valenzuela (180)
1995 – Hideo Nomo (236)
2011 – Clayton Kershaw (248)
2013 – Clayton Kershaw (232)
2015 – Clayton Kershaw (301)

Wins
1899 – Joe McGinnity (28)
1900 – Joe McGinnity (28)
1901 – Bill Donovan (25)
1921 – Burleigh Grimes (21)
1924 – Dazzy Vance (28)
1925 – Dazzy Vance (22)
1941 – Kirby Higbe & Whit Wyatt (22)
1956 – Don Newcombe (27)
1962 – Don Drysdale (25)
1963 – Sandy Koufax (25)
1965 – Sandy Koufax (26)
1966 – Sandy Koufax (27)
1974 – Andy Messersmith (20)
1986 – Fernando Valenzuela (21)
1988 – Orel Hershiser (23)
2006 – Derek Lowe & Brad Penny (16)
2011 – Clayton Kershaw (21)
2014 – Clayton Kershaw (21)
2017 – Clayton Kershaw (18)
2021 – Julio Urías (20)

See also
Baseball awards
List of MLB awards

Footnotes

Awa
Major League Baseball team trophies and awards